The Mauritius cuckooshrike (Lalage typica) is a species of bird in the family Campephagidae. It is endemic to Mauritius.

Its natural habitat is subtropical or tropical moist lowland forests. It is threatened by habitat loss.

References

External links
BirdLife Species Factsheet.

Lalage (bird)
Birds of Mauritius
Birds described in 1865
Endemic fauna of Mauritius
Taxonomy articles created by Polbot